Eupithecia cerynea is a moth in the family Geometridae first described by Herbert Druce in 1893. It is found in Guatemala.

The forewings and hindwings are white. The forewings with the costal margin and apex streaked and mottled with blackish grey, the anal angle clouded with greyish black and the marginal line black. The hindwings are slightly irrorated (sprinkled) with grey scales.

References

Moths described in 1893
cerynea
Moths of Central America